Świętokrzyski Park is an urban park in Warsaw, Poland, created in the 1950s near the Palace of Culture and Science.

Janusz Korczak Monument in Warsaw is located there.

References

Parks in Warsaw
1955 establishments in Poland